Worms: A Space Oddity is an artillery tactical game for the Wii. The game was released on March 18, 2008 in North America, with other regions following shortly afterwards.

Gameplay

A Space Oddity uses gesture based controls which allow players to launch various attacks. The game is rendered in 2D. The name is a reference to both 2001: A Space Odyssey and David Bowie's song "Space Oddity".

A Space Oddity is set in space itself, with the usual arsenal of weapons being updated to suit. There are 6 themes included, namely Cavernia, Tenticlia, Frostal, Kaputzol, Mechanopolis and Earth. The worms are customizable in terms of skin color and helmet style, as in Worms: Open Warfare 2.

Development
When Worms: A Space Oddity was announced, it was going to have Wi-Fi connection and downloadable content. Team17 later scrapped the idea of network play, with the publisher stating that it would be better if the players were able to taunt each other and play face-to-face.

Reception

While Eurogamer claimed that the gesture-based control is gimmicky and unreliable, most review sites said just the opposite, with IGN noting that "the first DS Worms... was drastically hurt by a sloppy control method, but that is entirely not the case this time around", and 1UP.com commenting that "the Wii motion controls are initially as friendly as a Rancor beast, but they're just as easily conquered", and "after a few Wiimote stabs, swings, and pumps, you'll probably never want to go back to traditional button-pressing controls".

References

External links
Worms: A Space Oddity on IGN

2008 video games
Artillery video games
Mobile games
Strategy video games
THQ games
Video games developed in the United Kingdom
Video games set on fictional planets
Wii games
 11
Java platform games